Ferguson River is a river in the South West region of Western Australia.

The only tributary of the river is Hough Brook.

The river was named after John Ferguson by the surveyor H.M. Ommanney. Ferguson owned a property along the river that Ommanney was surveying at the time.

The Ferguson Valley is a tourist area in the Shire of Dardanup with several wineries, restaurants, boutique breweries and art galleries to be found amongst the picturesque rolling hills. The area is also still utilised for grazing of dairy cattle.

References 

Rivers of the South West region
Swan Coastal Plain